, also known as  for short, is a Japanese light novel series written by Satoru Yamaguchi and illustrated by Nami Hidaka. It began serialization online in July 2014 on the user-generated novel publishing website Shōsetsuka ni Narō. It was acquired by Ichijinsha, who published the first light novel volume in August 2015 under their Ichijinsha Bunko Iris imprint. Twelve volumes have been released as of October 2022. The light novel has been licensed in North America by J-Novel Club.

A manga adaptation with art by Hidaka has been serialized in Ichijinsha's josei manga magazine Monthly Comic Zero Sum since August 2017. It has been collected in seven tankōbon volumes and licensed in English by Seven Seas Entertainment. A spin-off manga was serialized from November 2019 to July 2021. An anime television series adaptation produced by Silver Link aired from April to June 2020, and a second season aired from July to September 2021. An anime film is set to premiere in 2023.

Premise
Catarina Claes, the young daughter of a noble family, one day bumps her head and regains memories of her past life as a 17-year-old otaku girl. It is then that she realizes she has been reborn into the world of the otome game Fortune Lover as the game's villainess who, regardless of what route the player took in the original game, is doomed to be either exiled or killed. To avoid these routes that lead to doom, Catarina begins taking countermeasures. This, however, ends up having unexpected consequences on her relations with the other characters of the game's world.

Characters

A 17-year-old high school student/otaku who has been reincarnated as the villain character of the game Fortune Lover after she was hit by car while heading to school. Having extensive knowledge of Fortune Lover, including the fact that all the routes in the game lead to either her exile or death, she takes drastic measures to avoid such outcomes, such as trying to establish good relationships with her peers and taking up gardening as a profession should her exile come to pass. Her kind nature leads to many of the other characters falling in love with her, but she is generally oblivious to their affections. She has been given the nickname of "Bakarina" by fans due to her obliviousness, using the Japanese word "baka" in place of the first few syllables in her name.

A prince who became Catarina's fiancé after he inadvertently caused her to trip and injure herself, forcing him to take responsibility. In the game, Catarina uses this to her advantage to monopolize him for herself. In the good ending, he exiles Catarina and marries the protagonist, whilst the bad ending has him kill Catarina and abandoning the heroine due to guilt. Due to Catarina's continued efforts to better herself and avoid the bad endings, he now has developed genuine feelings for her and continuously tries to demonstrate his affection by confirming their engagement. However, it is overlooked by Catarina's dense persona, much to his chagrin.

Catarina's adoptive brother and an earth magic prodigy. The son of a distant relative of Duke Claes, Catarina's father adopted him after her engagement with Geordo to continue the Claes family name. In the game, Catarina bullied him under the belief he was a bastard child of her father, causing him to grow up to become a womanizer. In the good ending, he has Catarina exiled and abandons his womanizing ways to be with the protagonist, whilst the bad ending has him kill his sister in a fit of rage before disappearing. To avoid these endings, Catarina goes out of her way to be a good sister to him, which does improve their relationship, but also saddles Keith with the thankless task of having to keep Catarina out of trouble, mostly to no avail. Despite being her brother, he also develops feelings for Catarina.

Geordo's twin brother and Mary's fiancé. He was jealous of his more talented brother, which made him into an introvert. In the game, Catarina actually does not appear in his path, as Mary serves as the rival character instead. After Catarina becomes friends with Mary, he became angered by how she is constantly ignoring him in favor of her. This causes him to challenge Catarina to a series of competitions, which she handily wins. Over time, however, he and Catarina become friends and his relationship with his brother also becomes better. While he has a crush on Catarina, he has yet to realize this due to Mary's interference. 

Geordo and Alan's childhood friend and Sophia's brother. He is considered handsome by all who see him, with a smile that can charm both males and females. Details regarding his story in the game are sparse, since Catarina never played his route. Not only this, but the main rival in his route is Sophia Ascart, his younger sister as he is quite overprotective of her. Despite this though, he seems to have developed a crush on Catarina after she got him to open up to her.

Alan's fiancée and the rival character during his path in the game. Despite this though, she generally has better fates than Catarina, with her staying together with Alan in the bad ending and peacefully rescinding her fiancée status in the good one. While she and Catarina had no relationship in the game, she became good friends with the current Catarina after the latter praised her garden. However, in the game, she fell in love with Alan after he praised her garden; therefore, since Catarina praised it first, it now seems like she has developed romantic feelings for her instead.

Nicol's sister and the rival character during his path in the game, though details regarding her story are sparse since Catarina never played that route. She was considered cursed due to her silver hair and red eyes, causing her to live a life of isolation until she met Catarina and opened up to her because of Catarina's genuine compliments and offer to be her friend. It is eventually revealed that she is actually the reincarnation of Catarina's best friend during her previous life, .

A girl who, in Fortune Lover, was the main protagonist and original bullying target for Catarina. Due to Catarina becoming much nicer and charismatic, Maria ironically ends up falling in love with her, which in turn gives Maria a route of her own. She possesses light magic that is rare for a commoner, which lead to her being alienated during her childhood. 
 

A second-year student and the president of the student council, who played a side role in Fortune Lover. He possesses the fabled dark magic, and is the second villain in a secret route where if the main protagonist did not conquer him if one goes down that path, all the characters are killed, leading to the ultimate bad ending. In his childhood, he and his mother were kidnapped by Marchioness Dieke as part of plan to transfer her ailing son's consciousness into another child that will serve as his vessel using dark magic. Seeing his mother sacrificed in front of him as part of the ritual and developing dark magic in the process, a revenge-driven Raphael seeks to kill his oppressors aided by the spirit of the man responsible for the ritual, who too seeks revenge after being killed by the Marchioness Dieke's cohorts. After brainwashing the students to frame Catarina, kidnapping Maria when she discovers his treachery, and temporarily placing Catarina into a deep slumber, he was eventually found in his hideout by the group, who convince him to give up his vengeful ways. After overcoming the spirit, Raphael brings Marchioness Dieke to justice and eventually joins the Department of Magic.

Catarina's personal maid. She keeps tabs on Catarina for her mother, which usually ends with Catarina getting a stern lecture afterwards. It is revealed that Anne is the illegitimate daughter of a noble, Baron Shelley, and one of his maids. Her father decided to keep Anne in his mansion, intended as a tool for a political marriage. However, when a fire broke out in the mansion when Anne was 15, which killed her mother in the process, she was expelled after it was discovered she was scarred. She would later become Catarina's personal maid upon entering the Claes mansion. 
Millidiana Claes

Duchess Millidiana Claes is Catarina's biological mother and Keith stepmother. In Fortune Lover, she was a cruel stepmother to Keith since she thought Keith was her husband's bastard child with a mistress. Thanks to Catarina, Millidiana learns that this is not the case, which made her fall in love with her husband again. She is dismayed with her daughter's wild and unladylike behavior since the latter is engaged to a prince. As a result, she would prefer Catarina break her engagement with Geordo to save the Claes family any more embarrassment.
Luigi Claes

Duke Luigi Claes is Catarina's biological father and Keith stepfather. After Catarina got engaged to Geordo, he adopted Keith, who was the bastard son of one of his relatives to continue the Claes family name. However, this caused a misunderstanding with his wife who thought he did not love her and Keith was his biological son before Catarina helped cleared up the misunderstanding. Luigi loves his family and is a good boss to his servants where he defended Anne after she refuses to follow her father after the latter tried to forced her into an unwanted marriage with another noble.

The eldest brother of Geordo and Alan, and the first prince in line for the throne. While he acts like a fool in public, in reality he is a genius mastermind who uses his public persona to gather greedy and corrupt nobles who thinks they can control him so he can have them arrested when the time comes. He loves his brothers dearly and keeps a large collection of pictures of them in his room. Despite being first line for the throne, Geoffrey has no interest in becoming king and would rather have one of his younger brothers be king instead.

Geoffrey's fiancée. Despite being engaged, both Susanna and Geoffrey have no feelings for each other and are only engaged out of convenience. She seems to have feelings for Catarina as she enjoys hugging her and lets her join the Department of Magic with Maria.

The second prince in line for the throne and Geordo and Alan's second eldest brother. He tends to be quiet and shows little emotion, which led to rumors that he is cold and is unhappy with his engagement to Selena. In reality, Ian does love Selena but is embarrassed in showing affection as he feels it is inappropriate to show it to her in public until they get married.

Ian's fiancée. The daughter of a prominent noble family with powerful magic, she was engaged to Ian as part of an arrangement between their families. Being in love with Ian since they were children, Selena thrives to become a woman worthy of being his wife. However, as they grew older and it was discovered Selena was actually weak in magic, people began to disapprove of her engagement to Ian, with even her parents thinking they should call off their engagement, causing Selena to be insecure about herself.
 

A butler seemingly under the employment of Selena, he is instead using her to kidnap Catarina and then take the fall later, eliminating the major competition for Geoffrey to become king. He wields dark magic, which he uses to hypnotize his victims. Overtime, he begins to warm up to Catarina and reveal his vulnerable side to her, eventually turning in a new leaf and joining the Department of Magic after the mastermind behind the kidnapping is arrested.

Media

Light novels
The first light novel volume was published by Ichijinsha under their Ichijinsha Bunko Iris imprint on August 20, 2015. As of October 2022, twelve volumes have been published. The light novel is licensed in North America by J-Novel Club.

Manga
There have been two manga series associated with the light novel. The first, My Next Life as a Villainess: All Routes Lead to Doom!, has been serialized in Ichijinsha's Monthly Comic Zero Sum since August 28, 2017, and adapts the light novel series into manga format. The second, was also serialized in Monthly Comic Zero Sum  from November 1, 2019, to July 2, 2021. This manga focuses on the question of what would happen if Catarina were to recover her memories when she was fifteen as opposed to during her childhood, leaving her without the friends and relationships that she garnered as a result of early planning against her bad ends. Both manga series are licensed by Seven Seas Entertainment.

Ichijinsha published a yuri anthology of the series, titled , on June 26, 2020. The anthology is also licensed by Seven Seas Entertainment.

Volume list

My Next Life as a Villainess: All Routes Lead to Doom!

My Next Life as a Villainess Side Story: On the Verge of Doom!

Anime
An anime adaptation of the light novel series was announced by Ichijinsha on October 19, 2018. The anime was later announced to be a television series on July 18, 2019. The series was animated by Silver Link and directed by Keisuke Inoue, with Megumi Shimizu handling series composition, and Miwa Oshima designing the characters. Natsumi Tabuchi, Hanae Nakamura, Tatsuhiko Saiki, Miki Sakurai, and Shu Kanematsu composed the music.

The series aired on Tokyo MX, BS11, MBS, AT-X, J Tele, and other channels from April 5 to June 21, 2020. Angela performed the series' opening theme song , while Shouta Aoi performed the series' ending theme song "Bad End". Crunchyroll streamed the series with subtitles. On May 15, 2020, Crunchyroll announced the series would receive an English dub, which premiered the following day. Muse Communication has licensed the series in Southeast Asian territories and released via Animax Asia.

A second season aired from July 3 to September 18, 2021, on the Super Animeism programming block on MBS, TBS, and BS-TBS, as well as BS Asahi. Angela performed the second season's opening theme song , while Shouta Aoi performed the second season's ending theme song "give me ♡ me." An OVA was bundled with the special edition of manga's seventh volume, which was released on September 30, 2021. After the conclusion of the second season, it was announced that the series will be receiving an anime film. The film's title was revealed in April 2022, with its premiere set in 2023.

On May 18, 2021, it was announced that Sentai Filmworks had acquired the home video distribution rights.

Episode list

My Next Life as a Villainess: All Routes Lead to Doom!

My Next Life as a Villainess: All Routes Lead to Doom! X

Video games
Bonus DVDs containing demo versions of Fortune Lover, the in-universe otome game, were included in the limited editions of the anime's first season Blu-ray releases. A free-to-play mobile game titled  was released on July 31, 2020, with an online trial version being made available from June 19 to August 31, 2020. A game for the Nintendo Switch titled My Next Life as a Villainess: All Routes Lead to Doom! The Pirate Known as "Trouble" was released on December 23, 2021. The game has an original story that takes place beyond Fortune Lover's final graduation event, showing Catarina having evaded all the doom flags only to face a new doom flag related to a new meeting and encounter with a pirate.

Merchandise
On September 27, 2020, Premium Bandai began selling book cushions which "feature art of Catarina and her four (main) suitors" from the series, which each cushion folding up like a book, "featuring the character's name on the outside."

Reception
The light novel and manga have over 600,000 copies in print. The manga adaptation was ranked 4th in the 2019 Next Manga Awards in the print category.

LGBTQ
Some reviewers have described the series as focusing around Catarina Claes, who amasses a polyamorous, bisexual harem pining for her as she tries to avoid being a villain and becomes very thoughtful. Reviewers pointed out three queer female characters: Mary Hunt, Sophia Ascart, and Maria Campbell, all of whom have crushes on Catarina, as reviewer James Beckett of Anime News Network pointed out.

In May 2020, seven of the 10 spots of a "weekly favourite couple poll" by Anime Trending featured Catarina paired with most of the characters. After the first season ended, with a "friendship ending," one reviewer calling it a "very definitive ending for Catarina and Her Polyamorous Bisexual Harem of Doom," and the series was later praised by Rebecca Silverman and Theron Martin of the Anime News Network for being well-done, and offers "a rewarding bisexual power fantasy" which Catarina is unaware of due to her dense nature.

See also
 Accomplishments of the Duke's Daughter, a light novel also set in the world of an otome game
 I'm in Love with the Villainess, a light novel series with a similar plot

Notes

References

External links
  at Shōsetsuka ni Narō 
  
 

2010s LGBT literature
2015 Japanese novels
2020s LGBT literature
2020s Japanese LGBT-related television series
Anime and manga based on light novels
Animeism
Crunchyroll anime
Fiction about reincarnation
Harem anime and manga
Ichijinsha manga
Isekai anime and manga
Isekai novels and light novels
J-Novel Club books
Japanese LGBT-related animated television series
Josei manga
LGBT harem anime and manga
LGBT speculative fiction television series
Light novels
Light novels first published online
Male harem anime and manga
Muse Communication
Romantic comedy anime and manga
School life in anime and manga
Sentai Filmworks
Seven Seas Entertainment titles
Shōsetsuka ni Narō
Silver Link
Tokyo MX original programming
Works about bullying
Yuri (genre) anime and manga